Keegan Nash (born 18 July 1986 in  Adelaide, Australia) is an Australian former soccer player who is last known to have played for Adelaide Comets from 2011 to 2013.

India

Completing a move to Chirag United of the Indian I-League in October 2009, Nash partnered up with Brazilian Eduardo Du in defense, making his first start in a 2–1 triumph over Mumbai. However, an ankle injury during practice curtailed his stay there and the Australian defender was released later that month.

References

External links 
 at SportsTG
 

Australian expatriate sportspeople in India
Association football central defenders
Soccer players from Adelaide
Australian soccer players
Australian expatriate soccer players
Adelaide City FC players
Living people
1986 births
Expatriate footballers in India
United SC players
Adelaide Comets FC players